Lothar Koepsel (born 20 July 1945, in Berlin) is a sailor from East Germany. Koepsel represented his country at the 1972 Summer Olympics in Kiel. Koepsels took 14th place in the Soling with Roland Schwarz as helmsman and Werner Christoph as fellow crew member.

References

Living people
1945 births
Sportspeople from Berlin
East German male sailors (sport)
Sailors at the 1972 Summer Olympics – Soling
Olympic sailors of East Germany
German male sailors (sport)
European Champions Soling